This is a list of members of the Northern Territory Legislative Assembly from 1987 to 1990.

 Ian Tuxworth was elected as an NT Nationals member by a margin of 19 votes at the March election, but had his victory annulled by the Court of Disputed Returns after a successful challenge from losing independent candidate Maggie Hickey.  On 5 September, he won a by-election, again defeating Hickey, who was now representing the ALP.
 CLP member Ray Hanrahan resigned on 15 August 1988; NT Nationals candidate Enzo Floreani won the resulting by-election on 10 September.
 CLP member Don Dale resigned on 27 July 1989; Labor candidate John Bailey won the resulting by-election on 19 August.
 CLP member Col Firmin lost preselection prior to the 1990 election and became an independent.

See also
1987 Northern Territory general election

Members of Northern Territory parliaments by term
20th-century Australian politicians